Melanosteus is an extinct genus of small (skull about 5 centimeters long) selenosteid arthrodire placoderms of the Late Devonian period known from the Upper Frasnian Montagne Noire of Southern France. Rücklin (2011) regards Melanosteus as the sister taxon of Rhinosteus. During the Frasnian stage, Melanosteus occitanus lived off the coast of an island continent, "Armorica," which consisted of portions of what would become Southern France.

Etymology
The generic name literally translates as "black bone," the color referring to the translation of Montagne Noire, or "Black Mountains."  The specific name refers to Occitania, the region of Southern France where the fossils were found.

Phylogeny
Melanosteus is a member of the family Selenosteidae of the clade Aspinothoracidi, which belongs to the clade Pachyosteomorphi, one of the two major clades within Eubrachythoraci. The cladogram below shows the phylogeny of Melanosteus:

References

Selenosteidae
Placoderms of Europe